Antsla Parish is a rural municipality of Estonia, in Võru County.

Settlements
Town
Antsla
Small boroughs
Kobela - Vana-Antsla
Villages
Anne - Antsu - Haabsaare - Jõepera - Kaika - Kassi - Kikkaoja - Kirikuküla - Koigu - Kollino - Kraavi - Kuldre - Kõlbi - Litsmetsa - Luhametsa - Lusti - Lümatu - Madise - Mähkli - Oe - Pihleni - Piisi - Rimmi - Roosiku - Ruhingu - Savilöövi - Soome - Säre - Taberlaane - Toku - Tsooru - Uhtjärve - Urvaste - Uue-Antsla - Vaabina - Viirapalu - Visela - Ähijärve

Religion

Twinnings

Antsla Parish is twinned with:
 Perho, Finland
 Säffle, Sweden
 Uusikaupunki, Finland

References

External links